Accolades received by Sense and Sensibility may refer to:

 Accolades received by Sense and Sensibility (2008 TV serial)
 Accolades received by Sense and Sensibility (film)

See also
 Sense and Sensibility (disambiguation)